Dorcadion regulare is a species of beetle in the family Cerambycidae. It was described by Pic in 1931. It is known from Bulgaria, Turkey and Greece.

Subspecies
 Dorcadion regulare dramaticum Pesarini & Sabbadini, 2010
 Dorcadion regulare regulare Pic, 1931
 Dorcadion regulare sapkaianum Kretschmer, 1987

References

regulare
Beetles described in 1931